Luís Filipe Andrade de Oliveira (born 30 September 1973), known as Andrade, is a Portuguese retired professional footballer, currently manager of Brazilian club Flamengo (women). A gritty player with few skills, he operated mainly as a defensive midfielder but could also play as a defender.

Playing career
Andrade was born in Lisbon. After playing his youth football at Sporting CP, he went on to represent G.D. Estoril Praia, C.F. Estrela da Amadora, C.F. Os Belenenses, S.L. Benfica (five years, with one season loaned to S.C. Braga), Académica de Coimbra, C.D. Pinhalnovense, C.D. Olivais e Moscavide and Odivelas FC.

Andrade also had abroad spells with CD Tenerife (Spanish Segunda División) and AEP Paphos FC (Cypriot First Division, a few months), and finished his 21-year senior career in the regional championships in 2013, with GS Loures and Odivelas again. He amassed Primeira Liga totals of 193 games and one goal over 12 seasons, and was a member of the Portugal national side that competed at the 1996 Olympic Games, helping them to reach the fourth place.

Coaching career

Benfica
Andrade started working as a coach in 2010, going on to be in charge of several sides in the Lisbon Football Association. On 2 July 2019, he was named manager of Benfica women's team.

On 26 December 2020, Andrade left his position after only three losses during his spell, two of those being in the round of 32 of the UEFA Champions League against Chelsea.

Flamengo
On 8 December 2021, Andrade signed with Brazil's Clube de Regatas do Flamengo (women) to become the first foreign head coach in the club's history.

Honours

Manager
Benfica
Supertaça de Portugal Feminina: 2019

References

External links

1973 births
Living people
Portuguese footballers
Footballers from Lisbon
Association football midfielders
Association football utility players
Primeira Liga players
Liga Portugal 2 players
Segunda Divisão players
G.D. Estoril Praia players
C.F. Estrela da Amadora players
C.F. Os Belenenses players
S.L. Benfica footballers
S.C. Braga players
S.L. Benfica B players
Associação Académica de Coimbra – O.A.F. players
C.D. Pinhalnovense players
C.D. Olivais e Moscavide players
Odivelas F.C. players
GS Loures players
Segunda División players
CD Tenerife players
Cypriot First Division players
AEP Paphos FC players
Portugal youth international footballers
Portugal under-21 international footballers
Olympic footballers of Portugal
Footballers at the 1996 Summer Olympics
Portuguese expatriate footballers
Expatriate footballers in Spain
Expatriate footballers in Cyprus
Portuguese expatriate sportspeople in Spain
Portuguese expatriate sportspeople in Cyprus
Portuguese football managers
S.L. Benfica (women) managers
Clube de Regatas do Flamengo (women) managers
Portuguese expatriate football managers
Expatriate football managers in Brazil
Portuguese expatriate sportspeople in Brazil